Cryptochilus is a genus of flowering plants from the orchid family, Orchidaceae. Its species are native to China, the Himalayas, and Indochina.

Species
, Plants of the World Online accepted the following species:
Cryptochilus acuminatus (Griff.) Schuit., Y.P.Ng & H.A.Pedersen
Cryptochilus ctenostachyus Gagnep. - Vietnam
Cryptochilus luteus Lindl. - Yunnan, Assam, Bhutan, Nepal, Myanmar, Vietnam 
Cryptochilus petelotii Gagnep. - Vietnam
Cryptochilus roseus (Lindl.) S.C.Chen & J.J.Wood - Hainan, Hong Kong
Cryptochilus sanguineus Wall. - Yunnan, Assam, Bhutan, Nepal, Myanmar, Vietnam
Cryptochilus siamensis (Schltr.) Schuit., Y.P.Ng & H.A.Pedersen
Cryptochilus strictus (Lindl.) Schuit., Y.P.Ng & H.A.Pedersen

See also 
 List of Orchidaceae genera

References 

  (1824) Tentamen Florae Napalensis Illustratae 36, pl. 26.
  2005. Handbuch der Orchideen-Namen. Dictionary of Orchid Names. Dizionario dei nomi delle orchidee. Ulmer, Stuttgart
  (2006). Epidendroideae (Part One). Genera Orchidacearum 4: 552 ff. Oxford University Press.

External links 

Podochileae genera
Eriinae